The River Wye is a river in Buckinghamshire, England. Around  in length, it rises close to West Wycombe village in the Chiltern Hills and flows through High Wycombe before emptying into the River Thames at Bourne End, on the reach above Cookham Lock. In particularly wet years, the source can temporarily change and effectively extend the river by another mile, due to a chalk spring rising above the ground in a field further up the same valley.

High Wycombe takes part of its name from the river, which now runs mostly underground through the town. Pann Mill watermill, at the eastern end of Wycombe, is the last remaining watermill on the River Wye.

History
The Domesday Book records eighteen of them in the nine miles between West Wycombe and the Thames.
By the seventeenth century there were fulling mills as well as corn mills. A Court of Survey in 1627 lists six mills running upstream from the boundary with Wooburn Parish: the paper mill, Tredway, Loudwater, Bassetsbury, Chalfonts (Rye) and Bridge. There were by this time at least two paper mills: Glory in Wooburn Green and Hedge in Loudwater. By 1636 another paper mill had been established in the parish of West Wycombe and by 1656 another at Marsh, below Wycombe. At this time paper was made from rags and by the end of the eighteenth century more than 150 men were recorded as papermakers in the valley. In 1816 there were 32 paper mills (some of which also milled corn), four which only milled corn and one which was also a saw mill. This was when paper making reached its peak in the valley. However, the introduction of the Fourdrinier machine at the nearby Frogmore Paper Mill, which produced a continuous roll of paper, led to widespread unemployment and many families went to the cotton mills of Lancashire. In 1830 there were riots when machine wreckers broke the machines at Ash, Marsh Green and Loudwater. Twenty men were punished by penal transportation to Tasmania.

Papermaking continued at the Soho and Glory mills till the end of the twentieth century, though the water-mills gave way to steam in the mid-nineteenth century. The Soho mill in Wooburn was the prime supplier of high-grade colour paper till its demise in 1984.

Mills
Shown in order from highest to lowest. Note that Marsh Green to Treadway are on an extra cut parallel to Pan to Loudwater Mills. The number is that given by registration in the eighteenth century.

See also
Tributaries of the River Thames
List of rivers of England

References

Wye
High Wycombe
Papermaking in the United Kingdom
1Wye